Portulaca umbraticola, also known as the wingpod purslane, is a perennial succulent in the genus of flowering plants Portulaca.

Description 
Although this species can be easily mistaken for P. oleracea, its foliage tends to be much smaller and wider than that of other species. Flower colours range from yellow, pink, orange and blue and the stems, leaves, flowers and roots are edible. Plants grow up to 25 cm tall.

Subspecies
Three subspecies are recognized: P. u. coronata, P. u. lanceolata, and the nominate P. u. umbraticola.

References

Portulacaceae